Galtar and the Golden Lance is a 30-minute animated sword and sorcery television series produced by Hanna-Barbera Productions, which aired in syndication in 1985–86 as part of The Funtastic World of Hanna-Barbera. The show ran for 21 episodes and is thought to have been created due to the rising popularity of the He-Man franchise.

Premise
The series is about the mythical sword-and-sorcery adventures of three companions: Galtar, Princess Goleeta, and her younger mind controlling brother Zorn. Galtar, with the help of his Golden Lance, is fighting with Tormack, the tyrannical usurper of the kingdom of Bandisar, who is conquering their entire world. Tormack is responsible for the death of both Galtar's parents and assassinating the rest of Goleeta and Zorn's family.

Tormack covets the power of the Golden Lance, wishing to combine it with the Sacred Shield, which rightfully belongs to Goleeta and Zorn. Whoever holds both becomes invincible. The Golden Lance normally exists as a short staff. However, when Galtar holds it above his head with both hands, it extends two mystical blades, one on each side, and can then be divided into two swords for dueling. The enchantment that empowers the Golden Lance also protects it by releasing energy from its hilt (called the "Fury of the Golden Lance") when held by an unworthy wielder.

The series was cancelled before the final outcome of the conflict between Galtar and Tormack could be revealed.

Characters
 Galtar - The main character of the series and wielder of the Golden Lance.
 Princess Goleeta - The princess of Bandisar.
 Zorn - The younger, mind-controlling brother of Princess Goleeta.
 Thork - Galtar's loyal horse.
 Tormack - The primary villain of the series
 Rak and Tuk - A father and son dwarf duo who are inept mercenaries and have a tendency to double-cross others on both sides. They claimed that it was the only work that they know.

Supporting characters
 Ither - Keeper of the Golden Lance, who eventually puts it into Galtar's cave.
 Vikor - Leader of the raiders who also seeks the Golden Lance.
 Pandat - The prince of a race called Nerms, who occasionally aid the heroes.
 Marin - A feral child who rescues and befriends Zorn.
 Rava - Tormak's niece who allies herself with Galtar and Goleeta. She wore a magical gauntlet that could command fire and ice through the gemstones embedded in it. The gauntlet also had a black gemstone that could be used to summon Raven's Claw. Rava later gave this gauntlet to Goleeta.
 Raven's Claw - A fierce and powerful red dragon who comes to the aid of Galtar and Goleeta during the first episode of the series. Rava later gives Goleeta her magical gauntlet so she can summon Raven's Claw at will.

Episode list

Main voice cast
 Lou Richards - Galtar
 Mary McDonald-Lewis - Princess Goleeta
 Bob Frank - Rak
 David Mendenhall - Zorn
 Brock Peters - Tormack
 Frank Welker - Koda, Thork, Tuk

Additional voices
 Bob Arbogast - Ither
 Michael Bell - Yogoth (in "Love of Evil")
 Gregg Berger -
 Corey Burton -
 Greg Callahan -
 William Callaway -
 Henry Corden -
 Regis Cordic -
 Peter Cullen -
 Jennifer Darling -
 Barry Dennen - Krimm (in "Wicked Alliance")
 George DiCenzo - Otar
 Walker Edmiston -
 Richard Erdman -
 Pat Fraley -
 Linda Gary - 
 Dick Gautier -
 Bob Holt -
 Helen Hunt - Rava (in "Tormack's Trap," "The Return of Rava," "Love of Evil")
 Chuck McCann - Orlock
 Allan Melvin -
 Don Messick - Pandat
 Robert Ridgely -
 William Schallert -
 Diane Shalet -
 Ted Zeigler -

Other media
Galtar made a non-speaking cameo in the Harvey Birdman, Attorney at Law episode "SPF." Harvey calls him and his Golden Lance to the stand in a case involving cybersquatting.

Home media
On November 10, 2015, Warner Archive released Galtar and the Golden Lance: The Complete Series on DVD in region 1 as part of their Hanna–Barbera Classics Collection. This is a Manufacture-on-Demand (MOD) release, available exclusively through Warner's online store and Amazon.com.

References

External links
 
 Galtar and the Golden Lance at Don Markstein's Toonopedia. Archived from the original on July 31, 2016.

1980s American animated television series
1985 American television series debuts
1986 American television series endings
American children's animated action television series
American children's animated space adventure television series
American children's animated science fantasy television series
American children's animated superhero television series
Animated duos
DC Comics superheroes
English-language television shows
First-run syndicated television programs in the United States
Fictional duos
Hanna-Barbera superheroes
Sword and sorcery
Television series about princesses
Television series by Hanna-Barbera
The Funtastic World of Hanna-Barbera